National memorial or National Memorial may refer to:

National Memorial (Thailand)
National memorial (United States)
National Martyrs' Memorial, in Bangladesh
National Memorial of the Republic of Belarus

See also
Memorial (disambiguation)